The 2019 Abkhazian Premier League was canceled as there were only four teams registered. For this reason, the Football Federation of Abkhazia created the Victory Cup, to replace this edition of the Abkhazian Premier League.

Participating Teams
This edition of the competition was attended by 4 teams:

Ritsa FC,
FC Gagra,
Narth Aqwa,
Dinamo Aqwa.

Victory Cup 2019

Round 1
[Oct 10]
FC Gagra  2-0 Dinamo Aqwa

[Oct 11]
Ritsa FC  9-1 Narth

Round 2
[Oct 17]
Ritsa FC  3-1 Dinamo Aqwa

[Oct 18]
FC Gagra  0-1 Narth

Round 3
[Oct 24]
Narth  4-0 Dinamo Aqwa

[Oct 25]
Ritsa FC  1-0 FC Gagra

Round 4
[Oct 31]
Dinamo Aqwa  -  FC Gagra

[Nov 1]
Narth  3-3 Ritsa FC

Round 5
[Nov 7]
Dinamo Aqwa 1-3 Ritsa FC

[Nov 8]
Narth   -  FC Gagra

Round 6
[Nov 14]
Dinamo Aqwa 2-0 Narth

[Nov 15]
FC Gagra  4-1 Ritsa FC

Final
[Nov 18, Aqwa, Dinamo Stadium]

Ritsa FC  1-0  FC Gagra (T.Gublia 90+3)

Top Scorer
Marat Agrba (Ritsa FC) - 7 goals

References

Football in Abkhazia